The National Basketball League Most Outstanding Kiwi Guard is an annual National Basketball League (NBL) award given since the 1985 New Zealand NBL season to the best performing New Zealand guard(s) of the regular season. The winner receives the John Macdonald Trophy, which is named in honour of Macdonald, a New Plymouth native and a former captain of the New Zealand men's national basketball team.

Winners

See also
 List of National Basketball League (New Zealand) awards

References

Awards established in 1985
Kiwi
G
1985 establishments in New Zealand